The 2017 Motocross des Nations was a motocross race held on 1 October and 2 October 2017. The event was held at the Matterley Basin circuit, near Winchester, Great Britain. The event was originally meant to be held at Glen Helen Raceway in California, but had to be rescheduled due to concerns about crowd size.

France went into the event as the defending champions after taking their fourth title in 2016.

Entry List 
Start numbers are allocated based on the team finish from the previous year's edition. France are the reigning champions so they start with numbers 1, 2 and 3.

 Iran entered a team but did not show up.

Practice 
Practice is run on a class by class basis.

MXGP

MX2

Open

Qualifying Races 
Qualifying is run on a class by class basis.
Top 19 countries after qualifying go directly to the main Motocross des Nations races. The remaining countries go to the two smaller finals.
Best 2 scores count.

MXGP

MX2

Open

Qualification Standings 

 Qualified Nations

 Nations Admitted to the B-Final

 Nations Admitted to the C-Final

C-Final 
The C-Final is for the bottom 7 nations after qualifying. The top nation from the C-Final qualifies for the B-Final.
Best 2 scores for each nation counts.

Race

C-Final Standings 

 Poland qualify for the B-Final.

B-Final 
The B-Final is for the nations who finished 20th-31st in qualifying, plus the winning nation from the C-Final. The top nation from the B-Final qualify for the Motocross des Nations races.
Best 2 scores for each nation counts.

Race

B-Final Standings 

 Slovakia qualify for the Motocross des Nations races.

 Only 1 Polish rider started the race.

Motocross des Nations races 
The main Motocross des Nations races consist of 3 races which combine two classes together in each. Lowest score wins with each nation aloud to drop their worst score after the final race.

MXGP+MX2 

 Max Nagl was injured during the MX1 qualifying race.

Nations standings after Race 1

MX2+Open

Nations standings after Race 2

MXGP+Open

Nations standings after Race 3

Individual Classification

MXGP

MX2

Open

References

2017 in motorcycle sport
2017
October 2017 sports events in the United Kingdom